Tintin and the Temple of the Sun (original title Tintin et le temple du soleil) is a 1969 animated film produced by Belvision Studios. A co-production between Belgium, France and Switzerland, it is an adaptation of Hergé's two-part Tintin adventure The Seven Crystal Balls and Prisoners of the Sun.

Production 
Coming after the success of the Belvision cartoon series, Hergé's Adventures of Tintin, there was a lot of publicity for the movie (which was the first of two animated films, the second being 1972's Tintin and the Lake of Sharks).

Plot 
When seven archaeologists find an old Inca mummy, they become the victims of an Inca curse. Back in Europe, they fall into a deep sleep one by one and only once a day, at the same time, do they wake up for a few minutes and have hallucinations of the Inca god. The story begins with the sixth archaeologist falling asleep by the contents of a crystal ball thrown into his car by Incas.

Professor Tarragon stays with Tintin, Snowy and Captain Haddock in Marlinspike Hall, when the Thompsons arrive, Tarragon learns from them that he is the last Councious Professor. A thunderstorm approaches and the lights go out. This is used by the Incas to put the last one in sleep and to capture Professor Calculus, who has proved to be a desecrater of the sanctuary by putting on the bracelet of the Inca sun god.

His friends Tintin and Haddock follow the track to Peru, up to the mountains through snow and jungle and finally discover the Temple of the Sun, where they are caught. Their only choice is to choose the day on which they want to be burned to death by the sun. Tintin chooses wisely and is able use an eclipse. At the end he achieves forgiveness, the archaeologists are cured from their curse and Calculus is released.

Cast

Additional Voices
Geneviève Beau
Jacques Jouanneau
Jacques Ruisseau
Jacques Sablon
Bachir Touré

Changes from the books
Many scenes from the source books are deleted; in fact the whole of The Seven Crystal Balls is condensed into twenty minutes of film. Events were changed and some are added.  For example, the Prince of the Sun's daughter is introduced, who tries to beg her father to spare the prisoners (and likes Zorrino). Also, Thomson and Thompson accompany Tintin and Captain Haddock on their quest to rescue Professor Calculus, whereas in the books their only role is attempting to use dowsing in order to find Tintin and his friends (and their arrival in the Incan village delays the planned execution).

References

External links

1969 films
1969 animated films
Animated films based on comics
Belgian animated films
French animated films
Swiss animated films
Belgian children's films
French children's films
Swiss children's films
Films based on Belgian comics
Films set in Peru
1960s French-language films
Temple of the Sun
1960s French animated films
1960s children's animated films
French-language Swiss films
French-language Belgian films